Dzierzbia is a small river in north-eastern Poland, flowing within the administrative district of Gmina Stawiski in Kolno County, Podlaskie Voivodeship. It is being fed by several local streams. Dzierzbia is a right-tributary of another small river called Skroda, which begins near the village of Andrychy and empties into Pisa river near the town of Rudka-Skroda.

In 2001, a nature reserve has been established along Dzierzbia. It is called the Rezerwat "Uroczysko Dzierzbia" (Uroczysko Dzierzbia Nature Reserve, or Dzierzbia River Wilderness Reserve), located also within Gmina Stawiski. The reserve has been created for the protection of deciduous forest with a high level of natural purity. Main ecosystems include ash-alder wetlands (Circaeo-Alnetum), chickweed-alder wetlands (Stellario - Alnetum), European Fen-Alder (Carici elongatae-Alnetum), typical broadleaf forest (Tilio-Carpinetum), mixed forest (Melitti-Carpinetum), and bright oak wood (Potentillo albae - Quercetum).

The Uroczysko Dzierzbia Nature reserve is maintained and supervised by Forest District Office in Łomża (Nadleśnictwo Łomża).

See also
 Rivers of Poland
 List of rivers of Poland
 Geography of Poland

Notes and references

 Rezerwaty nadleśnictwa Łomża

Rivers of Poland
Nature reserves in Poland
Rivers of Podlaskie Voivodeship
Kolno County